This is a list of lists of places:

Cities proper 
 List of largest cities
 Lists of cities by country
 List of cities by continent (or continental region)
 Lists of cities in Africa
 Lists of cities in Asia
 Lists of cities in Central America
 Lists of cities in Europe
 List of cities in North America
 Lists of cities in Oceania
 List of cities in South America
 Territorial claims in Antarctica
 List of cities surrounded by another city
 List of cities by GDP
 List of cities by elevation
 List of cities by time of continuous habitation
 List of cities proper by population
 List of cities with the most skyscrapers
 List of cities with more than one commercial airport
 List of city name changes
 List of largest cities throughout history
 List of national capitals
 List of ghost towns by country
 List of towns and cities with 100,000 or more inhabitants
 Lists of city flags
 World's most livable cities
 Global city

Metropolitan areas 
 List of metropolitan areas by population
 List of largest metropolitan areas of the Middle East
 List of metropolitan areas in Africa
 List of metropolitan areas in Asia
 List of metropolitan areas in Europe
 List of metropolitan areas in the Americas
 List of metropolitan areas in Northern America
 List of metropolitan areas in the West Indies
 List of metropolitan areas in the European Union by GDP
 List of metropolitan areas that overlap multiple countries
 List of metropolitan areas by intentional homicide

Urban areas 
 Historical urban community sizes
 List of the largest urban agglomerations in North America
 List of urban agglomerations in Asia
 List of urban areas by population
 List of urban areas in Africa by population
 List of urban areas in the European Union
 List of urban areas in the Nordic countries
 List of the largest population centres in Canada
 List of United States urban areas

See also 
 Lists of neighborhoods by city
 Lists of cities and towns
 Lists of towns
 Lists of municipalities
 List of urban plans